SDF Group is an Italian agricultural machinery manufacturer founded in 1927 and with its headquarters in Treviglio (Bergamo), Italy. SDF is one of the world's leading manufacturers of tractors, combine harvesters, and diesel engines. The group's products are commercialized under the brand names SAME, Deutz-Fahr, Lamborghini Trattori, Hürlimann and Grégoire. The tractors produced by the group cover a power range from 25 to 440 HP, while its combine harvesters cover a range of powers up to 395 HP.

History of the group 
The history of the group dates back to 1927, with the creation of one of the first tractor powered by a diesel engine by brother Francesco and Eugenio Cassani. In 1942 the foundation of the company SAME (Società Accomandita Motori Endotermici) in Treviglio (Bergamo) crowned the company's founders' dream. After buying Lamborghini Trattori S.p.A. in 1973 from its founder Ferruccio Lamborghini, SAME embarked on a strategy of growth through acquisitions. With its acquisition of Hürlimann in 1979, the company changed its name to SAME-Lamborghini-Hürlimann (S-L-H).

In 1995, the group acquired Deutz-Fahr from the German group KHD, changing name definitively to SAME Deutz-Fahr (SDF).

SAME Deutz-Fahr India was founded in 1996.From 2003 to 2012, SDF was a shareholder in the German group Deutz AG In 2003, the group acquired 10% of the Finland based company Sampo-Rosenlew, which specialised in the production of components and 4 and 5 straw walker combine harvesters. This shareholding was subsequently sold.

In 2005, following its acquisition of the Croatia based company Ðuro Ðaković, the group founded the company Deutz-Fahr Combines, through which it now produces Deutz-Fahr branded components and combine harvesters.

In 2008, the Same Deutz-Fahr Historical Archives and Museum was established at the group's main headquarters in Treviglio.

In 2011, the group acquired Grégoire A/S, a company which specialised in equipment for wine farming, olive oil farming, pruning and for the treatment and harvesting of grapes and olives. Also in 2011, SDF initiated a joint venture in China with Shandong Changlin Machinery.

In 2014, the company SAME Deutz-Fahr  Traktör Sanayi ve Ticaret A.Ş. was founded in Istanbul, Turkey and the company Agricoltural Equipment in China is acquired and in 2016 SDF acquires the majority of the Chinese business.

Global operations 
SDF has 8 production sites, 12 commercial branches, 2 joint ventures, 155 importers, over 3,100 dealers, and 4,040 employees. In 2020 the company recorded a revenue of €1,146 millions.

SDF's farm equipment, machinery, and logistics research and development is funded by a €50 million European Investment Bank loan secured by the European Fund for Strategic Investments. The initiative is part of Horizon 2020 and is in accordance with the Paris Agreement's objectives. A senior engineer at the European Investment Bank, Matteo Fusari, who worked on the project, says, "We expect this project to have quite a good environmental impact." “It allows for vehicle automation and monitoring from a distance. These innovations will increase the efficiency of bioeconomy supply chains, in addition to reducing fuel consumption and CO2 emissions.”

Production plants
 Treviglio (Italy): mid and mid-high power tractors from 70 to 170 HP
 Lauingen (Germany): mid and mid-high power tractors from 120 to 440 HP
 Županja (Croatia): combine harvesters from 222 to 395 HP
 Ranipet (India): low and low-mid power tractors from 35 to 120 HP, diesel engines from 30 to 170 HP. 
 Châteaubernard (France): machines for grape and olive harvesting from 125 to 185 HP
 Bandirma (Turkey): mid-power tractors from 50 to 105 HP
 Linshu (China): tractors from 25 to 270 HP, harvesting machines, from 32 to 140 HP
 Suihua (China): tractors with 210 HP

Awards 

Tractors produced by the SDF group have earned numerous awards and accolades over the years. These include:

Brands 

 SAME
Deutz-Fahr 
 Lamborghini Trattori
 Hürlimann
 Grégoire

References

External links 

 SDF Group official site

 
Agricultural machinery manufacturers of Italy
Tractor manufacturers of Italy
Italian brands
Manufacturing companies established in 1927
Italian companies established in 1927
Companies based in Lombardy
Province of Bergamo